Emmanuel Emuejeraye (born 21 July 1988 in Nigeria) is a Nigerian former professional footballer who is last known to have donned the colors of Gombak United in Singapore. He is the brother of Precious Emuejeraye.

Singapore

Traveling to Singapore in 2006 due to the preponderance of football opportunities there, Emuejeraye first became part of the Gombak United Under-18 side before being promoted to the Prime League team where he featured 12 times and scored 8 goals in 2007, earning him a promotion to their first team. Afterwards, the Nigerian attacker was chosen to be in a Nokia advertisement as well as one of the 12 S.League footballers in the H-TWO-O Hip Hop Move Campaign.

References

External links 
 at Soccerway

Living people
Association football forwards
1988 births
Nigerian footballers
Nigerian expatriate footballers
Expatriate footballers in Singapore
Gombak United FC players